The following is a list of all light rail systems in North America, ranked by ridership. Daily figures for American and Canadian light rail systems are "average weekday unlinked passenger trips" (where transfers between lines are counted as two separate passenger "boardings" or "trips"), unless otherwise indicated. For light rail systems in the United States and Canada, these figures come from the American Public Transit Association (APTA) Ridership Reports statistics. For Mexico, the figures are obtained from Banco de Información Económica's Instituto Nacional de Estadísitica y Geografía (INEGI), and the daily figures represent daily passenger trips averaged from the monthly and quarterly ridership figures. All figures are from 2019 and the fourth quarter (Q4) of 2019, unless otherwise noted. "Daily boardings per mile" figures have been rounded to the nearest 5 or 10. 

The question of which systems would qualify as "light rail transit systems" is debatable, so this table includes some systems (such as Toronto's) which are technically streetcars rather than "true" light rail.

Systems

Excluded systems

The following systems have been excluded from the ridership table above (generally because the system's ridership statistics are not tracked by APTA): 
 Galveston Island Trolley (Galveston, TX)
 Kenosha Streetcars (Kenosha, WI)
 Metro Streetcar (Little Rock, AR)
 River Street Streetcar (Savannah, GA)

See also

 Light rail in North America
 Light rail
 List of tram and light rail transit systems
 List of United States light rail systems by ridership
 Light rail in the United States
 Streetcars in North America
 List of Latin American rail transit systems by ridership
 List of North American rapid transit systems by ridership
 List of United States rapid transit systems by ridership
 List of rail transit systems in the United States
 Public transportation

Notes

References 

Light rail in Canada
Light rail in Mexico
Light rail in the United States